Michael "Black Mike" Winage (14 March 1870 – 15 March 1977) was a Serbian Canadian miner, pioneer and adventurer who settled in the Yukon towards the end of the Klondike Gold Rush and who allegedly lived to be 107 years old.

Biography
Born in the Principality of Serbia in 1870 as Mihajlo Vojnić, Winage reportedly left home at age 12, in 1882, for Canada. He claimed to have been a guide and to have travelled as far as Aklavik, as well as a Constable with the Royal Canadian Mounted Police.

By the time he arrived in the Yukon on 5 March 1900 with his dogs and horses gold had been discovered elsewhere in Canada and Alaska, prompting a new stampede, this time away from the Klondike.

Although the Klondike Gold Rush was virtually over Winage began prospecting anyway. In the Yukon Winage was originally known as "Big Mike" because of his large size. After becoming a woodcutter he became known as "Sawdust Mike". After helping to unload 400 tons of coal in 1918 he finally became known as "Black Mike", a nickname which stuck with him for the rest of his life.

Career
In 1961, when the Auditorium, a local theater in Dawson City, was being demolished, Winage saw an opportunity to make money by searching for the gold dust that had fallen from the prospectors and through the floorboards to the ground beneath:

Last years
In 1968, aged 98, Winage was included in a National Geographic article on 'The Canadian North', which reported he was still panning for gold in the hills. Claiming to have outlived three wives and all his friends, he spent the last 20 years of his life in MacDonald Lodge, a home for senior citizens, in Dawson City, Yukon Territory. He died the day after his 107th birthday.

References

External links
'Deaths in the News – Mike Winage' – Reading Eagle – 17 March 1977
'Dies at 107' – The Tuscaloosa News – 18 March 1977

1870 births
1977 deaths
19th-century Canadian people
20th-century Canadian people
19th-century Serbian people
20th-century Serbian people
Canadian people of Serbian descent
Canadian miners
Canadian gold prospectors
Canadian centenarians
People of the Klondike Gold Rush
Serbian centenarians
Men centenarians
Serbian expatriates in Canada